An Oratorian is a member of one of the following religious orders:
 Oratory of Saint Philip Neri (Roman Catholic), who use the postnominal letters C.O.
 Oratory of Jesus (Roman Catholic)
 Oratory of the Good Shepherd (Anglican)
 Teologisk Oratorium (Lutheran)

See also
 Oratory (disambiguation)